Étienne Piquiral (June 15, 1901 – March 13, 1945) was a French rugby union player who competed in the 1924 Summer Olympics. He was born in Perpignan and died in a prisoner-of-war camp during World War II.

In 1924 he won the silver medal as member of the French team.

References

External links
 
 
 
 

1901 births
1945 deaths
Sportspeople from Perpignan
French rugby union players
Olympic rugby union players of France
Rugby union players at the 1924 Summer Olympics
Olympic silver medalists for France
France international rugby union players
French military personnel of World War II
French military personnel killed in World War II
World War II prisoners of war held by Germany
Medalists at the 1924 Summer Olympics
French prisoners of war in World War II